Hutspiel was a theater-level war game created in 1955 on an analogic computer by the Operations Research Office, a civilian military research center conducted by the Johns Hopkins University. The game was played by two people, red and blue, representing a war simulation between NATO and USSR forces. The game was designed to study the use of tactical nuclear weapons and air support in Western Europe in the case of Soviet invasion.

References

1955 video games
Cold War video games
Mainframe games
Military combat simulators
Video games developed in the United States
Video games set in Europe